Sarthak Golui (born 3 November 1997), is an Indian professional footballer who plays as a defender for Indian Super League club East Bengal and the India national team.

Club career

Early career and Mohun Bagan 
Born in Kolkata, West Bengal, Golui was a part of the AIFF Elite Academy before trialing with I-League side, Mohun Bagan. On 9 January 2016, Golui made his professional debut with Mohun Bagan in the opening game of the I-League season against Aizawl. He came on in the last minute for Kean Lewis as Mohun Bagan won 3–1.

International career
Golui has represented India at both the under-16 and under-19 level. He played AFC cup qualify round 2017 against Maldives club

Personal life 
Gouli's father, Deb Kumar, was a former football player.

Career statistics

Club

Honours

India
 SAFF Championship runner-up: 2018

References

External links 
 All India Football Federation Profile.

1997 births
Living people
Footballers from Kolkata
Indian footballers
Mohun Bagan AC players
East Bengal Club players
Association football defenders
I-League players
India youth international footballers
2019 AFC Asian Cup players
India international footballers
FC Pune City players
Mumbai City FC players
Bengaluru FC players
Indian Super League players